786 Bredichina (prov. designation:  or ) is a carbonaceous and very large background asteroid, approximately  in diameter, located in the outer region of the asteroid belt. It was discovered by German astronomer Franz Kaiser at the Heidelberg-Königstuhl State Observatory on 20 April 1914. The elongated C-type asteroid has a longer than average rotation period of 29.4 hours. It was named after Russian astronomer Fyodor Bredikhin (1831–1904).

Orbit and classification 

Bredichina is a non-family asteroid of the main belt's background population when applying the hierarchical clustering method to its proper orbital elements. It orbits the Sun in the outer main-belt at a distance of 2.7–3.7 AU once every 5 years and 8 months (2,068 days; semi-major axis of 3.18 AU). Its orbit has an eccentricity of 0.16 and an inclination of 15° with respect to the ecliptic. The body's observation arc begins at Heidelberg Observatory on 21 April 1914, the night after its official discovery observation.

Naming 

This minor planet was named after Fyodor Bredikhin (1831–1904), also known as Theodor or Feodor Alexandrovich Bredichin, a Russian astronomer and director of the Pulkovo Observatory. He has made important contributions to the study of comets. The  was also mentioned in The Names of the Minor Planets by Paul Herget in 1955. The lunar crater Bredikhin is also named after him.

Physical characteristics 

In the Tholen classification, Bredichina is a common, carbonaceous C-type asteroid. It is also a C-type and C0-type in the Tedesco and Barucci classification from the 1908s.

Rotation period 

In March 2015, a rotational lightcurve of Bredichina was obtained from photometric observations by Spanish astronomers Alfonso Carreño , Amadeo Aznar , Enrique Arce , Pedro Brines , and Juan Lozano . Lightcurve analysis gave a rotation period of  hours with a brightness variation of  magnitude.

Previously, in August 2008, Argentine astronomer Ricardo Gil-Hutton derived period of  hours with an amplitude of  magnitude. Tentative measurements were also made by Italian Nicola Cornero and Federico Manzini at the Sozzago Astronomical Station  in May 2010, which gave a period of  hours with an amplitude of  magnitude.

Diameter and albedo 

These timed observations are taken when the asteroid passes in front of a distant star.

References

External links 
 Lightcurve Database Query (LCDB), at www.minorplanet.info
 Dictionary of Minor Planet Names, Google books
 Asteroids and comets rotation curves, CdR – Geneva Observatory, Raoul Behrend
 Discovery Circumstances: Numbered Minor Planets (1)-(5000) – Minor Planet Center
 
 

000786
Discoveries by Franz Kaiser
Named minor planets
000786
19140420